Laura Benz (born 25 August 1992) is a Swiss ice hockey defender.

International career
Benz was selected for the Switzerland national women's ice hockey team in the 2010 Winter Olympics. She played in all five games, scoring a goal.

Benz has also appeared for Switzerland at one IIHF Women's World Championship. Her first appearance came in 2009.

Benz made three appearances for the Switzerland women's national under-18 ice hockey team, at two levels of the IIHF World Women's U18 Championships. Her first came in 2008.

Personal life
Her twin sister Sara Benz is also a hockey player.

Career statistics

See also
List of Olympic medalist families

References

External links

Sports-Reference Profile

1992 births
Living people
Ice hockey people from Zürich
Ice hockey players at the 2010 Winter Olympics
Ice hockey players at the 2014 Winter Olympics
Ice hockey players at the 2018 Winter Olympics
Olympic ice hockey players of Switzerland
Olympic bronze medalists for Switzerland
Olympic medalists in ice hockey
Medalists at the 2014 Winter Olympics
Swiss women's ice hockey defencemen
Twin sportspeople
Swiss twins